Moon-Dominick House, also known as the Old Tin House, is a historic home located near Chappells, Newberry County, South Carolina.  It was built about 1820, and is a -story, frame I-house with Federal style details.  It has a high brick basement, gable roof, and exterior end chimneys.

It was listed on the National Register of Historic Places in 1982.

References

Houses on the National Register of Historic Places in South Carolina
Federal architecture in South Carolina
Houses completed in 1820
Houses in Newberry County, South Carolina
National Register of Historic Places in Newberry County, South Carolina